The 1972 Liège–Bastogne–Liège was the 58th edition of the Liège–Bastogne–Liège cycle race and was held on 20 April 1972. The race started and finished in Liège. The race was won by Eddy Merckx of the Molteni team.

General classification

References

Further reading
 

1972
1972 in Belgian sport